Portrun or Portrunny is a lakeside townland, located on the bank of Lough Ree on the River Shannon in County Roscommon.

It has mooring facilities for boats, a children's playground and picnic tables; and is a tourist destination in the summer months.

St. Diarmuid's holy well, associated with Diarmaid the Just, is located here. It is said that he often stopped in Portrun here on the way to the sanctuary of Inchcleraun (Quaker Island), where the ruins of seven churches can still be seen.

References

Townlands of County Roscommon